Ogemawahj Tribal Council is a non-profit Regional Chiefs' Council representing Mississaugas, Ojibwa and Potawatomi First Nations in southern Ontario, Canada.  The Council provides advisory services and program delivery to its six member-Nations.

Mandate

According to their own website, the Ogemawahj Tribal Council state their mandate is "...to represent and conduct Tribal Council business in the approved name of the Ogemawahj Tribal Council ... To exercise this delegation with respect and proper duty ... And to comply fully with the wishes and expectations of those First Nations from which the OTC authority is derived."

Council

The Council is made up of a representing Chief from each of the six member communities. The Chiefs provide political direction to the organization in its strategic planning, government relations and policy development.  To assist in these activities, the Council maintains a political and advocacy staff to support its efforts in helping their communities to prosper.

Services

 Economic Development
 Education
 Capacity Building and Professional Development for Education Managers
 Curriculum development
 Education as a key component in Self-government
 Education Services Contract development and negotiation
 Information gathering and resource services
 Post-secondary funding policy development
 School Reviews of First Nation operated schools
 Special Education advisory services
 Employment and Training
 Financial Management
 Technical Services
 Community Asset Management Systems
 Community Planning
 Compliance Inspections on new or renovated homes
 Capital Asset Management Systems (CAMS)
 Environmental Assessments
 Ontario Building Code Standards
 Project Management
 Residential Rehabilitation Assistance Program (RRAP)
 Water & Waste water training
 Policy, Planning and Inter-governmental Relations

Member First Nations

    Mississaugas of Alderville First Nation
    Chippewas of Beausoleil First Nation
    Chippewas of Georgina Island First Nation
    Chippewas of Rama First Nation
    Mississaugas of Scugog Island First Nation
    Pottawatomi of Moose Deer Point First Nation

External links
INAC profile
Ogemawahj Official Website

Ojibwe in Canada
Potawatomi
Anishinaabe tribal political organizations
First Nations tribal councils in Ontario